The 2015 Miami Beach mayoral election took place on November 3, 2015, to elect the mayor of Miami Beach, Florida. The election was held concurrently with various other local elections, and was officially nonpartisan. Mayor Philip Levine secured reelection with over 50% of the vote, avoiding a runoff.

References

External links
Mayor & Commissioner Home - miamibeachfl.gov
City of Clerk Elections @ City of Miami Beach

2015
2015 United States mayoral elections
2015 Florida elections